Kenneth Leon Maddy (May 22, 1934 – February 19, 2000) was a Republican member of the California State Assembly and State Senate from Fresno.

Maddy was born in Santa Monica. He attended Fresno State College and graduated in 1957 with a Bachelor of Science degree in agriculture. He served in the State Assembly for Fresno County from 1971 to 1978. Maddy ran unsuccessfully for governor in the 1978 Republican primary, having finished in third place with 484,583 votes (19.2 percent). The nomination went to state Attorney General Evelle J. Younger, but he was defeated by the Democratic Governor Edmund G. "Jerry" Brown, Jr., in the general election. Maddy was then elected to the State Senate in a 1979 Special Election, serving there until 1998. He was the chairman for the Senate Republican Caucus from 1979 to 1983 and was the Republican Leader of the Senate from 1987 to 1995.

Legacy
Kenneth L. Maddy Institute, Department of Political Science, California State University-Fresno
Kenneth L. Maddy Equine Analytical Chemistry Laboratory, School of Veterinary Medicine, University of California, Davis
Sacramento Area Youth Golf (SAY Golf), Freeport Boulevard, Sacramento
Cal State Fresno created the Maddy Institute to help and inspire college students to work in public service.
The Oak Tree Racing Association named a stakes race in his honor in 2000. Taking place at the Santa Anita Park, it is now known as the Senator Ken Maddy Handicap. It was previously known as the Autumn Days Handicap.
The University of California at Davis is home to an equine drug testing laboratory named after Maddy.  This lab is a joint venture between the Veterinary Medical School and the California Department of Food and Agriculture's Animal Health and Food Safety Laboratory.

References

External links

1934 births
2000 deaths
Republican Party California state senators
Republican Party members of the California State Assembly
People from Fresno, California
People from Santa Monica, California
California State University, Fresno alumni
20th-century American politicians